Madonna and Child is a 1496-1499 oil on panel painting by Cima da Conegliano, now in the Los Angeles County Museum of Art.

Variants
Unusually for the artist, who usually produced unique works, this one seems to belong to a group of at least five works produced from a single cartoon.

References

Los Angeles
1490s paintings
Collection of the Los Angeles County Museum of Art